Lafayette Parish is a parish located in the U.S. state of Louisiana. According to the 2020 U.S. census, the parish had a population of 241,753, up from 221,578 at the 2010 United States census. The parish seat is the city of Lafayette. The parish was founded in 1823. Since 1996, the city and parish have operated as a consolidated government.

Etymology 
The city and parish of Lafayette were named in honor of the Marquis de Lafayette, the French general who took part in the Continental Army in the American Revolutionary War and financially aided it.

Geography
Lafayette Parish is a part of the region of Acadiana in southern Louisiana, along the Gulf Coast. It is the fifth-smallest parish in Louisiana by land area and third-smallest by total area.

Major highways

  Interstate 10
  Interstate 49
  U.S. Highway 90
  U.S. Highway 167
  Louisiana Highway 89
  Louisiana Highway 89-1
  Louisiana Highway 92
  Louisiana Highway 92-1
  Louisiana Highway 93
  Louisiana Highway 96
  Louisiana Highway 182
  Louisiana Highway 3073

Adjacent parishes
 St. Landry Parish  (north)
 St. Martin Parish  (east)
 Iberia Parish  (southeast)
 Vermilion Parish  (south)
 Acadia Parish  (west)

National protected area
 Jean Lafitte National Historical Park and Preserve (part, in Lafayette)

Communities

Cities 
 Broussard
 Carencro
 Lafayette (parish seat and largest municipality)
 Scott
 Youngsville

Town 
 Duson

Census-designated places 
 Milton
 Ossun

Unincorporated communities 

 Capitan
 Elks
 Gloria
 Judice
 Larabee
 Long Bridge
 Mouton
 Pilette
 Pont Des Mouton
 Ridge
 River Ranch
 Sadou
 Stekey
 Vatican
 Walroy

Demographics

According to the 2020 United States census, there were 241,753 people, 94,490 households, and 59,937 families residing in the parish. According to the 2019 American Community Survey, there were 244,390 people living in the parish. The racial and ethnic makeup of Lafayette Parish was 65.7% non-Hispanic white, 25.9% Black and African American, 0.2% American Indian and Alaska Native, 1.9% Asian, 0.3% some other race, 1.5% two or more races, and 4.6% Hispanic and Latino American of any race. In 2020, the racial and ethnic makeup was 62.24% non-Hispanic white, 25.1% Black and African American, 0.3% American Indian and Alaska Native, 2.16% Asian, 0.03% Pacific Islander, 3.57% multiracial or some other race, and 6.61% Hispanic or Latino American of any race.

In 2019, the median age was 35.2 and 76.2% of the population were aged 18 and older; 12.7% of the population were aged 65 and older. Of its population, 4.2% were foreign born, with the majority coming from Latin America, Asia, and Europe. Among the population, 10.1% spoke another language other than English at home; Spanish was the second most-spoken language in 2019, and French was third.

There were 91,543 households at the 2019 census estimates, and 44.4% were married couples living together; 8.0% of households were cohabiting couples, 17.8% male households with no female present, 12.7% single-person households, and 29.7% female households with no female present. The average household size was 2.59 and the average family size was 3.22. There was an employment rate of 62.5% and 28,206 businesses operating in the parish; 5,734 businesses were minority-owned and 2,774 were veteran-owned.

Out of the 102,491 housing units in 2019, the median gross rent was $874, and median housing value was $185,300. At the 2019 American Community Survey, the median household income was $56,999; males had a median income of $54,653 versus $38,378 for females. An estimated 17.3% of the population lived at or below the poverty line.

Education
Lafayette Parish School System operates public schools for the parish.

Lafayette Parish is home to the University of Louisiana at Lafayette, Louisiana's second largest public university behind Louisiana State University. It is also home to the main campus of South Louisiana Community College (the parish is in the community college's service area), a Remington College in Lafayette, a Blue Cliff College in Lafayette, an Aveda Institute, and a Louisiana Technical College in Lafayette.

Politics
The parish voters often supported Democratic presidential candidates before the 1970s, but the majority of conservative whites has trended Republican since that time. Before 1965 and passage of the Voting Rights Act by the U.S Congress, most African Americans were disenfranchised, as they had been since 1898, when Louisiana passed a new constitution establishing barriers to voter registration and voting. They, along with poor white voters, were excluded from the political system. After regaining the power to register and vote, black voters tended to affiliate with and support national Democratic Party candidates.

The majority of the parish voted for the Republican presidential candidates from 1992 to 2020, and did so by generally increasing margins. The results in 2004 gave Republican George W. Bush 64% of the vote and 57,732 votes while Democrat John F. Kerry won 35% of the vote and 31,210 votes. In the 2008 election Lafayette Parish cast the majority of its votes for Republican John McCain. He won 65% of the vote and 62,055 votes. Democrat Barack Obama was strongly supported by African Americans and won 34% of the vote, some 32,145 votes.

Law enforcement

The Lafayette Parish Sheriff's Office (LPSO) is the sheriff's department in Lafayette Parish, Louisiana. The department, headed by Sheriff Mark T. Garber, consists of around 750 sworn and non-sworn employees. Although the LPSO's jurisdiction consists of the entire parish of Lafayette, in order to not duplicate services provided by local city police, the primary patrol area is the unincorporated areas of the parish. It also runs the Lafayette Parish Correctional Center. The LPSO is CALEA (Commission on Accreditation for Law Enforcement Agencies) accredited and has taken part in Operation FALCON.

In 2003, the Lafayette Parish Sheriff's Office joined with the University of Louisiana to create ALETA, the Acadiana Law Enforcement Training Academy. This academy trains new LPSO deputies and UL Police officers, as well as recruits from several other police agencies in South Louisiana, to become P.O.S.T. certified law enforcement officers. The program is an eleven-week course that provides physical training and conditioning along with classroom instruction.

Lafayette Parish is further served by the Lafayette Police Department, University of Louisiana at Lafayette Police Department, and the Lafayette City Marshal.

National Guard
The HQ and other units of the 256th IBCT reside in the city of Lafayette, Louisiana.  This unit of over 3,500 Soldiers has deployed twice to Iraq, 2004-5 and 2010.  This unit has also responded to disasters such as: Hurricane Katrina, Hurricane Gustav, Hurricane Isaac, and the Gulf of Mexico Oil Spill.

Notable people
 Lauren Daigle, (born 1991), Grammy-nominated CCM singer
 Jefferson Caffery, (1886-1974), U.S. Ambassador to El Salvador, Colombia, Cuba, Brazil, France and Egypt
 Benjamin Flanders, (1816-1896), politician, Alderman of New Orleans (1847-1852), founder of the Republican Party of Louisiana in 1864, appointed governor of Louisiana in 1867, retired in 1880s to his Ben Alva plantation here
 Jerry Luke LeBlanc (born 1956), former state legislator and vice president of administration and finance at the University of Louisiana at Lafayette
 Alexandre Mouton, (1804–1885), born in Attakapas, United States Senator and Governor of Louisiana.
 Frank Schmitz, (1945-1966), four time NCAA champion gymnast and silver medal winner at the 1965 Trampoline World Championships.

See also

 Lafayette Parish Sheriff's Office
 National Register of Historic Places listings in Lafayette Parish, Louisiana

References

External links
 Lafayette Consolidated Government
 Lafayette Economic Development Authority
 Lafayette Convention and Visitors Commission
 Lafayette Public Library
 Lafayette Parish Clerk of Court
 Lafayette Parish American History and Genealogy Project
Geology
 Heinrich, P. V., and W. J. Autin, 2000, Baton Rouge 30 x 60 minute geologic quadrangle. Louisiana Geological Survey, Baton Rouge, Louisiana.
 Heinrich, P. V., J. Snead, and R. P. McCulloh, 2003, Crowley 30 x 60 minute geologic quadrangle. Louisiana Geological Survey, Baton Rouge, Louisiana.

 
1823 establishments in Louisiana
Parishes in Acadiana
Acadiana
Lafayette metropolitan area, Louisiana
Populated places established in 1823